The Kansas and Oklahoma Railroad  is a shortline railroad operating in the Midwestern United States. It is primarily located in Kansas and extends into Colorado, but despite its name, not into Oklahoma.

Overview
The KO is a subsidiary of Watco, which took over the operations of the Central Kansas Railway (CKRY) on June 29, 2001. The CKRY property (which by this time included the merged Kansas Southwestern Railway) was purchased from OmniTrax and was named the Kansas & Oklahoma Railroad.

The KO consists of trackage radiating north and west from their headquarters at Wichita, Kansas.  Most of this trackage was originally operated by the Atchison, Topeka & Santa Fe, although a few segments were originally operated by the Missouri Pacific.

The tracks Kansas & Oklahoma RR operate on also includes portions of the former Missouri Pacific Kansas City to Pueblo main line in Western Kansas and Eastern Colorado.

KO owns  of track, and another  is accounted for in trackage rights.

Subdivisions
 the K&O consisted of the following subdivisions:
 Hutchinson Subdivision (Wichita, Kansas to Hutchinson, Kansas)
 Conway Springs Subdivision  (Wichita, Kansas to Kingman, Kansas via Conway Springs, Kansas)
 Kingman Subdivision (Garden Plain, Kansas to Pratt, Kansas)
 Isabel Subdivision  (Coats, Kansas to Graham, Kansas)
 Great Bend Subdivision (Hutchinson, Kansas to Larned, Kansas)
 Geneseo Subdivision  (Sterling, Kansas to Geneseo, Kansas)
 Scott City Subdivision (Great Bend, Kansas to Scott City, Kansas)
 Hoisington Subdivision (Geneseo, Kansas to McCracken, Kansas and Healy, Kansas to Towner, Colorado)
 Salina Subdivision (Salina, Kansas to Osborne, Kansas)
 McPherson Subdivision (McPherson, Kansas to Conway, Kansas)
 Newton Subdivision (Newton, Kansas to McPherson, Kansas)

See also
 Marion & McPherson Railroad – Defunct railroad of which K&O currently uses the parts that haven't been abandoned

References

External links
 Kansas and Oklahoma Railroad map
 Current Kansas Railroad Map

Colorado railroads
Companies based in Kansas
Kansas railroads
Railway companies established in 2001
Regional railroads in the United States
Watco